The 1926 Úrvalsdeild is an season of top-flight Icelandic football.

Overview
For the first time since the inaugural year, 1912, a team outside Reykjavík participated, taking the number of teams to an unprecedented five. Like the first year ÍBV was the only team outside the capital to enter. KR won the championship.

League standings

Results

References

Úrvalsdeild karla (football) seasons
Iceland
Iceland
Urvalsdeild